Qualification for the 2013 United States Men's Curling Championship consisted of three different paths. Four teams qualified directly through the High Performance Program or the Order of Merit system. The number of the remaining entrants to the national championships was cut down to six teams through a challenge round held in early January.

Qualification system
Teams qualified to participate in the men's national championship through the High Performance Program, through the World Curling Tour Order of Merit, or through a challenge round.

Automatic qualification
Two spots in the nationals were awarded to two teams on the United States Curling Association's High Performance National Program, established as an invitation-based program for the development of the top curling teams in the United States. The teams qualified through the High Performance Program were those skipped by Pete Fenson and Heath McCormick. Two more spots were awarded to the top two men's teams on the World Curling Tour Order of Merit standings table following the conclusion of the Iron Trail Motors Shoot-Out. If one or both of the top teams were already qualified for the nationals through the High Performance Program, the spot or spots would have been awarded to the team with the next highest position on the Order of Merit. The teams qualified through the Order of Merit were those skipped by Tyler George and John Shuster.

Challenge round
The remaining six spots in the nationals will be awarded to the teams that earn qualification spots through the challenge round. The challenge round was held in a triple knockout format, and was an open registration event. The teams that entered the challenge round were seeded through a strength of field ranking and through a peer ranking. The strength of field ranking was based on players' participation and performance in national championships and world championships. The seedings influenced the draw of the triple knockout event.

Challenge round
The challenge round for the men's nationals was held from January 2 to 6 at the Hibbing Curling Club in Hibbing, Minnesota. The teams skipped by Craig Brown, Greg Persinger, Ryan Lemke, Brady Clark, Mike Farbelow, and Todd Birr advanced from the challenge round to the nationals.

Teams
The teams are listed as follows:

Knockout Draw Brackets
The draw is listed as follows:

A Event

B Event

C Event

Knockout results
All draw times listed in Central Standard Time (UTC-6).

Draw 1
Wednesday, January 2, 4:00 pm

Draw 2
Wednesday, January 2, 8:00 pm

Draw 3
Thursday, January 3, 8:00 am

Draw 4
Thursday, January 3, 12:00 pm

Draw 5
Thursday, January 3, 4:00 pm

Draw 6
Thursday, January 3, 8:00 pm

Draw 7
Friday, January 4, 9:00 am

Draw 8
Friday, January 4, 2:00 pm

Draw 9
Friday, January 4, 7:00 pm

Draw 10
Saturday, January 5, 9:00 am

Draw 11
Saturday, January 5, 2:00 pm

Draw 12
Saturday, January 5, 7:00 pm

Draw 13
Sunday, January 6, 9:00 am

Draw 14
Sunday, January 6, 2:00 pm

References

2013 in curling
United States National Curling Championships
Qualification for curling competitions